Simcoe County Council is the governing body for Simcoe County, in Ontario, Canada.

The council consists of the Warden, Deputy Warden, and County Councillors (a total of 32), who represent the sixteen municipalities within the county. The council posts or council meetings.

There are six county departments: Engineering, Planning and Environment, Statutory and Cultural Services, Corporate Performance, Health and Emergency Services, Social and Community Services, and the Chief Administrative Office and Warden.

2014-2018 County Council

External links 
Agendas and minutes

References

County and regional councils in Ontario
Simcoe County